Gregg Knob is a summit near Afton, West Virginia, in the United States.

The summit was named after Elihu Gregg, an early settler. A ski slope with two tows operated on the northeastern face of Gregg Knob from 1955 to 1961.

References

Mountains of Preston County, West Virginia
Mountains of West Virginia